Stublenica is a village in the Central Serbian municipality of Ub that had 888 inhabitants in 2011.

Populated places in Kolubara District